Hay Creek is a stream in Kanabec County, in the U.S. state of Minnesota. It is a tributary of the Snake River.

Hay Creek was named for nearby meadows where hay was produced.

See also
List of rivers of Minnesota

References

Rivers of Kanabec County, Minnesota
Rivers of Minnesota